The 1921 St. Louis Cardinals season was the team's 40th season in St. Louis, Missouri and the 30th season in the National League. The Cardinals went 87–66 during the season and finished 3rd in the National League.

Regular season 
Rogers Hornsby hit .397 in 1921, and his 21 home runs were second in the league. He also led the league in on-base percentage (.458), slugging percentage (.639), runs (131), RBI (126), doubles (44), and triples (18).

Season standings

Record vs. opponents

Roster

Player stats

Batting

Starters by position 
Note: Pos = Position; G = Games played; AB = At bats; H = Hits; Avg. = Batting average; HR = Home runs; RBI = Runs batted in

Other batters 
Note: G = Games played; AB = At bats; H = Hits; Avg. = Batting average; HR = Home runs; RBI = Runs batted in

Pitching

Starting pitchers 
Note: G = Games pitched; IP = Innings pitched; W = Wins; L = Losses; ERA = Earned run average; SO = Strikeouts

Other pitchers 
Note: G = Games pitched; IP = Innings pitched; W = Wins; L = Losses; ERA = Earned run average; SO = Strikeouts

Relief pitchers 
Note: G = Games pitched; W = Wins; L = Losses; SV = Saves; ERA = Earned run average; SO = Strikeouts

Awards and honors
Rogers Hornsby, National League batting champion
Top 12 Players of the season:
 Rogers Hornsby (WAR 10.8)
 Austin McHenry (WAR 5.1)
 Jack Fournier (WAR 4.2)
 Bill Doak (WAR 3.0)
 Verne Clemons (WAR 2.5)
 Jack Smith (WAR 2.3)
 Les Mann (WAR 2.3)
 Milt Stock (WAR 2.0)
 Doc Lavan (WAR 1.9)
 Jesse Haines (WAR 1.8)
 Bill Sherdel (WAR 1.6)
 Joe Schultz (WAR 1.5)

Farm system

References

External links
1921 St. Louis Cardinals at Baseball Reference
1921 St. Louis Cardinals team page at www.baseball-almanac.com

St. Louis Cardinals seasons
Saint Louis Cardinals season
St Louis